Bury St Edmunds is a constituency represented in the House of Commons of the UK Parliament since 2015 by Jo Churchill, a Conservative.

Constituency profile 
The constituency covers Bury St Edmunds, Stowmarket and smaller settlements on the A14 corridor. Residents' wealth is around average for the UK.

History 
The constituency was created as a Parliamentary Borough in 1614, returning two MPs to the House of Commons of England until 1707, then to the House of Commons of Great Britain until 1800, and from 1800 to the House of Commons of the United Kingdom. By the mid eighteenth century the seat was seen as heavily influenced by the Earl of Bristol and the Duke of Grafton. Its representation was reduced to one seat under the Redistribution of Seats Act 1885. Under the Representation of the People Act 1918, it was abolished as a borough and reconstituted as a division of the Parliamentary County of West Suffolk. As well as the abolished borough, the expanded seat comprised most of the abolished Stowmarket Division, except for the town of Stowmarket itself. From 1950, it has been classified as a county constituency in terms of election expenses and type of returning officer.

The electorate has elected Conservative Party candidates at the general elections and two by-elections since a Liberal victory in 1880. The closest contest since that year was in 1997 when the Labour Party candidate fell 368 votes, less than 1%, short of winning the seat in 1997 during Tony Blair's first landslide result.

Boundaries and boundary changes 

1918–1950: The Borough of Bury St Edmunds, the Urban District of Newmarket, the Rural Districts of Brandon, Mildenhall, and Thedwastre, and parts of the Rural Districts of Moulton and Thingoe.

1950–1983: The Borough of Bury St Edmunds, the Urban Districts of Haverhill and Newmarket, and the Rural Districts of Clare, Mildenhall, Thedwastre, and Thingoe.

Extended to the south-west, gaining western and northern parts of the abolished Sudbury Division of West Suffolk, including Haverhill.

1983–1997: The Borough of St Edmundsbury wards of Abbeygate, Barningham, Barrow, Chevington, Eastgate, Fornham, Great Barton, Honington, Horringer, Ixworth, Northgate, Pakenham, Risby, Risbygate, Rougham, St Olave's, Sextons, Southgate, Stanton, Westgate, and Whelnetham, and the District of Forest Heath.

Southern areas, including Haverhill, transferred to the new County Constituency of South Suffolk. The easternmost area, equivalent to the former Rural District of Thedwastre, transferred to the new County Constituency of Central Suffolk.

1997–2010: The Borough of St Edmundsbury wards of Abbeygate, Eastgate, Fornham, Great Barton, Horringer Court, Northgate, Pakenham, Risbygate, Rougham, St Olave's, Sextons, Southgate, Westgate, and Whelnetham, and the District of Mid Suffolk wards of Badwell Ash, Elmswell, Gislingham, Haughley and Wetherden, Needham Market, Norton, Onehouse, Rattlesden, Rickinghall, Ringshall, Stowmarket Central, Stowmarket North, Stowmarket South, Stowupland, Thurston, Walsham-le-Willows, and Woolpit.

Major reconfiguration, with the majority of the constituency, including Newmarket, forming the basis of the new County Constituency of West Suffolk. Extended eastwards, gaining western half of Central Suffolk, including Stowmarket.

2010–present: The Borough of St Edmundsbury wards of Abbeygate, Eastgate, Fornham, Great Barton, Horringer and Whelnetham, Minden, Moreton Hall, Northgate, Pakenham, Risbygate, Rougham, St Olave's, Southgate, and Westgate, and the District of Mid Suffolk wards of Bacton and Old Newton, Badwell Ash, Elmswell and Norton, Gislingham, Haughley and Wetherden, Needham Market, Onehouse, Rattlesden, Rickinghall and Walsham, Ringshall, Stowmarket Central, Stowmarket North, Stowmarket South, Stowupland, Thurston and Hessett, and Woolpit.

Marginal changes due to revision of local authority wards.

The constituency contains the towns of Bury St Edmunds, Stowmarket and Needham Market. Its boundaries do not match those of the borough of St Edmundsbury, which includes Haverhill (part of West Suffolk constituency), and excludes Stowmarket and Needham Market.

Members of Parliament

MPs 1621–1660

MPs 1660–1885
Two Members

MPs since 1885

Elections

Elections in the 2010s

Note: Independent politician St Edmundsbury Borough Councillor and Bury St Edmunds Town Councillor Paul Hopfensperger submitted a valid nomination but this was subsequently withdrawn.  Because of the timing of the withdrawal, his name appears in the Statement of Persons Nominated for this election.

Elections in the 2000s

Elections in the 1990s

Elections in the 1980s

Elections in the 1970s

Elections in the 1960s

Elections in the 1950s

Elections in the 1940s

Following the death of Frank Heilgers on 16 January 1944 a by-election was held on 29 February 1944.

Elections in the 1930s

Elections in the 1920s

On Guinness's nomination as Minister of Agriculture a by-election in 1925 was required under the electoral law of the time, which he won.

Elections in the 1910s

General Election 1914–15:

Another General Election was required to take place before the end of 1915. The political parties had been making preparations for an election to take place and by July 1914, the following candidates had been selected; 
Unionist: Walter Guinness
Liberal:

Elections in the 1900s

Elections in the 1890s

Elections in the 1880s

Elections in the 1870s

Elections in the 1860s

Elections in the 1850s

 
 

 Caused by Hervey's succession to the peerage, becoming 2nd Marquess of Bristol

 
 

 
 

 Caused by Stuart's resignation after being appointed a Vice-Chancellor of the Court of Chancery.

Elections in the 1840s

  
 

 Caused by Hervey's appointment as Treasurer of the Household

Elections in the 1830s

  

 

 Caused by FitzRoy's appointment as Vice-Chamberlain of the Household

See also 
 List of parliamentary constituencies in Suffolk

Notes

References

Sources

External links 
nomis Constituency Profile for Bury St Edmunds – presenting data from the ONS annual population survey and other official statistics.

Parliamentary constituencies in Suffolk
Bury St Edmunds
Borough of St Edmundsbury